The 1937 Cincinnati Bearcats football team was an American football team that represented the University of Cincinnati as a member of the Buckeye Athletic Association during the 1937 college football season. The Bearcats were led by head coach Russ Cohen who went 0–5 before captain Wade Woodworth took over, also going 0–5 and compiled a 0–10 season record.

Schedule

References

Cincinnati
Cincinnati Bearcats football seasons
College football winless seasons
Cincinnati Bearcats football